Lycaena candens is a small butterfly found in the Palearctic (Southeast Europe and Caucasus) that belongs to the lycaenids or blues family.

Subspecies
 L. c. leonhardi  (Fruhstorfer, 1917)
 L. c. pfeifferi (Beuret, 1952) Caucasus, Transcaucasia

Description from Seitz

The males have no blue sheen and the forewing above is entirely golden brown in the females; the black margin of the upperside is narrower in both sexes.

Biology
The larva on  feeds on Rumex

See also
List of butterflies of Russia

References

Lycaena
Butterflies described in 1844